Karl Dodrimont (born 14 January 1939) is a retired bantamweight freestyle wrestler from West Germany. He won a bronze medal at the 1965 World Championships and placed sixth at the world and European championships in 1966. He also competed at the 1964 Summer Olympics.

References

1939 births
Living people
German male sport wrestlers
Wrestlers at the 1964 Summer Olympics
Olympic wrestlers of the United Team of Germany
World Wrestling Championships medalists